The 1910 Portland Beavers season was the eighth season in the history of the Portland Beavers baseball team. The team compiled a 114–87 record and won the Pacific Coast League (PCL) pennant by one-and-a-half games over the Oakland Oaks. The Beavers won five PCL pennants between 1906 and 1914.

Walt McCredie was the team's player-manager, and shortstop Pearl Casey was the team captain. Pitchers Gene Krapp and Vean Gregg finished first and second in the PCL in both strikeouts and earned run average (ERA).

Management

The team was owned by Judge William Wallace McCredie, who later represented the State of Washington in the U.S. House of Representatives. McCredie also served as the club's president while his son, Hugh, was the business manager and his wife, Alice, managed the ticket office. His nephew Walt McCredie played in the National League, batting .324 in 1903, but joined the Portland club as player-manager in 1904 after his uncle became the owner. Walt McCredie was both the manager and appeared in 61 games, mostly in right field. Shortstop Pearl Casey was the team captain.

Pitchers

The pitching staff was the strength of the 1910 Beavers team.

Vean Gregg, a native of Chehalis, Washington, appeared in 53 games (383-1/3 innings) and compiled a 32–18 record. He led the PCL with 373 strikeouts and ranked second in the league with a 1.53 earned run average (ERA) and 32 wins.

Gene Krapp, a New York native, appeared in 54 games (442 innings) and compiled a 29–16 record. He led the PCL with a 1.26 ERA and ranked second in the league with 265 strikeouts.

Bill Steen, a Pittsburgh native, appeared in 54 games (414-2/3 innings) and compiled a 27–17 record with 188 strikeouts.

Nebraska native Tom Seaton appeared in 52 games and compiled a 17–17 record with a 1.99 ERA.

Infielders

First baseman Bill Rapps, a Missouri native, appeared in 207 games and compiled a .236 batting average with 31 stolen bases, 32 doubles, nine triples, and three home runs.

Second baseman and team captain Pearl Casey appeared in 177 games and compiled a .241 batting average with 22 doubles and four triples.

Shortstop Ivy Olson appeared in a team-high 210 games, led the team with 39 stolen bases, and compiled a .237 batting average with 25 doubles and four triples.

The third base position was shared between Gus Hetling (.234 batting average in 86 games) and Sacramento native Tommy Sheehan (.201 batting average in 110 games).

Catcher Gus Fisher appeared in 163 games, led the team with a .382 slugging percentage and tallied 31 doubles, eight triples, and five home runs.

Outfielders

Center fielder Buddy Ryan, a Denver native, anchored the outfield. Appearing in 206 games, he compiled a .242 batting average and led the team with 190 hits and 13 home runs.

Art Kruger appeared in 63 games in left field and center field.  His .281 batting average was identical to batting champion Hunky Shaw, but Shaw was awarded the batting title as he had more than double Kruger's at bats.

Bill Speas appeared in 151 games, principally in left field and center field. He compiled a .200 batting average and stole 22 bases.

George Ort appeared in 151 games, principally in right field and at second base. He compiled a .213 batting average.

Felix Martinke, a native of Germany, was purchased by Portland from the Vernon Tigers on June 19, 1910. Player-manager McCredie said at the time he would play Martinke in right field, allowing McCredie to "retire to the bench" and devote his full time to managing the team. During his combined time with Vernon and Portland, Martinke appeared in 101 games and compiled a .230 batting average.

1910 PCL standings

Statistics

Batting 
Note: Pos = Position; G = Games played; AB = At bats; H = Hits; Avg. = Batting average; HR = Home runs; SLG = Slugging percentage; SB = Stolen bases

Pitching 
Note: G = Games pitched; IP = Innings pitched; W = Wins; L = Losses; PCT = Win percentage; ERA = Earned run average

References

1910 in sports in Oregon
Pacific Coast League seasons